Elections to Lambeth London Borough Council were held on 6 May 2010. All 63 seats were up for election. Turnout was 58%. The Labour Party retained control of the council, increasing its majority. The elections took place on the same day as other local elections and the United Kingdom general election.

Summary of results

Ward results
* - Existing Councillor seeking re-election.

Bishop's

Brixton Hill

Clapham Common

Clapham Town

Coldharbour

Ferndale

Gipsy Hill

Herne Hill

Knight's Hill

Larkhall

Oval

Prince's

St Leonard's

Stockwell

Streatham Hill

Streatham South

Streatham Wells

Thornton

Thurlow Park

Tulse Hill

Vassall

References

2010
2010 London Borough council elections
May 2010 events in the United Kingdom
21st century in the London Borough of Lambeth